Olax nana, known as Sudiyo in Gujarat, is a species of flowering plant in the Olacaceae family.

The species is a small, woody shrub found in Pakistan, India, Nepal, and Thailand.

Conservation
The species is of special concern in Gujarat, India, where it is the sole representative of the family in the state. It was first found in the state in the early 20th century, but since 1910, wasn't found in subsequent surveys. Local efforts have been enacted to protect the small population, including the construction of grazing enclosures and raising awareness.

References

Olacaceae
Flora of Pakistan
Flora of India (region)
Flora of Nepal
Flora of Thailand